Anne Frances Sutton   (3 November 1942 – 18 June 2022) was a British historian.

Biography
Sutton was a trustee of the Richard III and Yorkist History Trust since its foundation in 1985. Her research focussed on Medieval English history, especially Richard III and Medieval women. She was elected as a Fellow of the Society of Antiquaries of London in 1984. She was also a Fellow of the Royal Historical Society. From 1979 until her death she was the editor of The Ricardian, the academic journal of the Richard III Society. After graduating from St Hugh's College, Oxford, where she earned her bachelor's degree, she was a professional actress.

Selected publications
Sutton, A.F. and Hammond, P.W. 1984. The Coronation of Richard III : the extant documents. St Martin's Press. 
Hammond, P.W. and Sutton, A.F. 1985. Richard III : the road to Bosworth Field. Constable.
Sutton, A.F. and Visser-Fuchs, L. 1997. Richard III's books : ideals and reality in the life and library of a medieval prince. Sutton Publications.
Sutton, A.F. 2005. The mercery of London : trade, goods and people, 1130-1578. Routledge.
Sutton, A.F. and Visser-Fuchs, L. (eds) 2009. The book of privileges of the Merchant Adventurers of England, 1296-1483. Oxford University Press.
Sutton, A.F. 2016. Wives and widows of medieval London. Shaun Tyas Publishing.
Sutton, A.F. 2021. The King's Work: The Defence of the North under the Yorkist Kings 1471-85. Shaun Tyas Publishing.

References

1942 births
2022 deaths
British historians
Fellows of the Society of Antiquaries of London
Fellows of the Royal Historical Society
Writers from Bury St Edmunds
Women medievalists